Nostalgialator is a studio album by American hip hop musician Mike Ladd. It was released on Studio !K7 in 2004. It was re-released on Definitive Jux in 2007.

Critical reception

At Metacritic, which assigns a weighted average score out of 100 to reviews from mainstream critics, the album received an average score of 76, based on 5 reviews, indicating "generally favorable reviews".

Marisa Brown of AllMusic gave the album 3.5 out of 5 stars, writing, "Perhaps Nostalgialator isn't the artist's most provocative work, but his mix of indie electronica, rock, blues, punk, hip-hop, and spoken word certainly makes it one of his most interesting and fulfilling endeavors."

Track listing

Personnel
Credits adapted from liner notes.

 Jeff Cordero – keyboards (1, 10), guitar (10)
 Jaleel Bunton – guitar (2, 3, 5)
 Damali Young – drums (2, 3, 5)
 Vijay Iyer – keyboards (7, 11), synthesizer (8)
 Ambrose Akinmusire – trumpet (7)
 Dana Leong – trombone (7)
 Scotty Hard – guitar (11)

References

External links
 

2004 albums
Mike Ladd albums
Studio !K7 albums
Definitive Jux albums